The 2018 Fórmula Academy Sudamericana Championship season is the third season of this series, and the first under the Fórmula Academy Sudamericana name. It began on the 22 July at the Autódromo Internacional Ayrton Senna, Londrina in Brazil and finished on 9 December at the Autódromo Víctor Borrat Fabini in Uruguay after 6 rounds.

Drivers

Race calendar and results
The grid for race 2 is determined by the finishing order of race 1, but with the top 6 reversed.

Championship standings

Points system
Points were awarded as follows:

Fórmula Academy Sudamericana Championship

Juan Vieira was crowned the 2018 champion at the final round.

References

External links
 

Fórmula 4 Sudamericana seasons
Sudamericana
Formula 4
Formula 4